Pipunculus zugmayeriae is a species of fly in the family Pipunculidae.

Distribution
Belgium, Great Britain, Czech Republic, Denmark, Finland, Germany, Hungary, Latvia, Poland, Slovakia, Switzerland, Netherlands.

References

Pipunculidae
Insects described in 1887
Diptera of Europe
Taxa named by Ferdinand Kowarz